National Secondary Route 165, or just Route 165 (or ) is a National Road Route of Costa Rica, located in the Guanacaste province.

Description
In Guanacaste province the route covers Bagaces canton (Bagaces, Fortuna, Mogote districts).

References

Highways in Costa Rica